Joseph Bennett was a footballer who played for Burslem Port Vale in December 1899.

Career
Bennett played for Porthill before joining Burslem Port Vale in September 1899. His only known appearance at the Athletic Ground came against New Brighton Tower, in a 1–1 draw on 30 December 1899. He was released at the end of the season.

Career statistics
Source:

References

Year of birth missing
Year of death missing
English footballers
Association football fullbacks
Port Vale F.C. players
English Football League players